Joseph Mahfouz, OLM (born 20 February 1932 in Ghadir, Lebanon - died 25 August 2010, Ghadir, Lebanon) was a clergyman of the Maronite rite and eparch of the Maronite Catholic Eparchy of Our Lady of Lebanon of São Paulo. He was the third eparch of the Maronite Church in Brazil.

Biography
Joseph Mahfouz joined the Congregation of the OLM and received on 29 June, 1960, the ordination to the priesthood. Pope John Paul II appointed him on June 9, 1990, Archbishop of the Eparchy of the Our Lady of Lebanon in São Paulo. Maronite Patriarch of Antioch, Nasrallah Boutros Sfeir gave him on 12 August of the same year the episcopal ordination. His co-consecrators were Bishops Roland Aboujaoudé, Maronite auxiliary bishop of Antioch and Bechara Boutros al-Rahi, OMM, future Maronite Patriarch of Antioch. Mahfouz resigned as Bishop of Our Lady of Lebanon in São Paulo on 14 October, 2006. He died of cancer and was buried in the cemetery Nisbei Ghosta in Lebanon.

Works
 Saint Charbel Makhlouf: monk and hermit of the Lebanese Maronite Order. 1976.
 La Servante de Dieu La Soeur Rafqa de Himalaya. Rome, 1980.
 Short history of the Maronite Church. Imprimerie St. Paul, 1986.
 The blessed Nimatullah Kassab Al-Hardini. In: Volume 26 by Third Centennial Lebanese Maronite Order Publications, Monastery of Saints Cyprian and Justine, 1998.
 The blessed Nimatullah Kassab Al-Hardini: His life, words and spiritualities. Lebanese Maronite Order.

References

External links
 http://www.catholic-hierarchy.org/bishop/bmahfouz.html
 http://sinaxe.wordpress.com/2010/08/27/dom-joseph-mahfouz-faleceu/

1932 births
2010 deaths
Eastern Catholic bishops in Brazil
Lebanese Maronites
21st-century Maronite Catholic bishops
20th-century Maronite Catholic bishops
Lebanese Eastern Catholic bishops